The International Military Staff (IMS) is an advisory body of the North Atlantic Treaty Organisation's (NATO) Military Committee (MC), which in turn supports the North Atlantic Council (NAC). Based in NATO's headquarters in Brussels, Belgium, the IMS has five divisions and c. 500 staff seconded from NATO member states and is led by a Director General.

Divisions
The IMS consists of the following divisions:
Intelligence (INT)
Operations and Plans (O&P)
Policy and Capabilities (P&C)
Cooperative Security (CS)
Logistics and Resources (L&R)

See also

Structure of NATO
North Atlantic Council
NATO Military Committee
International Staff
European Union Military Staff

References

External links

NATO Military Committee
Staff (military)
NATO headquarters